S.N.G is Taiwanese singer Nick Chou's second album released on May 30, 2012 by Gold Typhoon.

The album marks Chou's first album release after nearly two years since his Nick Chou album in 2010. He also switched his label from Warner Music Taiwan to Gold Typhoon.

Some of his songs, which includes "Heartache", "One Out Of A Million", and his title track, "S.N.G" were included in the official soundtrack of his first television series, I Love You so Much, released on April 17, 2012.

Production
All the tracks are written by Chou as he dreams to be a singer-songwriter in the future. He personally takes on the composing, arranging, and producing works of the entire album, which he spent a year writing. The songs on his album were picked by his manager out of 200 songs that he wrote.

His title track, S.N.G stands for "Super Nice Girl". It is an R&B song about a search for a girlfriend. In ironic, however, Chou has no plans to look for relationships in the moment, and just be with his mother, Billie.

In addition, his other song "Heartache" (內傷), which was also featured in I Love You so Much, was coincidentally written after his break up with his former girlfriend, Elva Hsiao in October 2010. However, Chou explained that he do not write songs about relationships, but about life only.

Other songs include "This is Your Song", a soothing song that demonstrates Nick's vocal style, the David Ke-penned "Internal Injury", and Maji Maji which is dedicated to Nick's mother.

Promotion
The album had preorder sales on May 15, prior to its release. Later on, his record company organized a concert for him at Legacy venue on June 16 since the album had already sold fifteen thousand copies in preorder sales even before its release. In addition, Chou held a mini-concert the night before the release of the album to showcase some of his new songs.

Track listing

Music videos
 "One Out Of A Million"
 "S.N.G"
 "這是你的歌" (This Is Your Song)
 "內傷" (Internal Injury)
 "麻吉麻吉" (Maji Maji)

Charts

Taiwan

Hong Kong

Singapore

Malaysia

Release history

References

External links

2012 albums
Nick Chou albums
Mandarin-language albums